Oobleck may refer to:

 Oobleck, a non-Newtonian fluid made from a mixture of cornstarch and water

Arts and entertainment
 Oobleck, a fictional green substance in the Dr. Seuss book Bartholomew and the Oobleck
 Theater Oobleck, a theater company based in Chicago, US
 Dr. Bartholomew Oobleck, a character from the animated series RWBY